51st meridian may refer to:

51st meridian east, a line of longitude east of the Greenwich Meridian
51st meridian west, a line of longitude west of the Greenwich Meridian